Vladimir Komarov (1927–1967) was Soviet cosmonaut, killed on landing of the Soyuz 1 mission.

Vladimir Komarov may also refer to:

 Kosmonaut Vladimir Komarov, satellite tracking ship, named after the cosmonaut
Vladimir Komarov (speed skater) (1949–2018), Olympic speed skater
Vladimir Leontyevich Komarov (1869–1945), Russian botanist
Vladimir Komarov (footballer) (born 1980), Russian association football player
Vladimir Andreyevich Komarov (born 1976), Russian musician

Komarov, Vladimir